Montano in Italian, both Montano and Montaño in Spanish, is a surname

It may refer to:

 Aldo Montano (fencer born 1910), Italian fencer
 Aldo Montano (fencer born 1978), Italian fencer and grandson of the above fencer
 Alicia Gómez Montano (1955–2020), Spanish journalist
 Mario Aldo Montano, Italian fencer and son of the fencer born in 1910
 Cesar Montano, multi-awarded Filipino actor and film director
 Justiniano Montano (1905-2005), Filipino politician
 Linda Montano, American contemporary feminist performance artist
 Machel Montano (born 1974), Trinidad and Tobago soca singer, record producer and songwriter
 Mark Montano, American interior designer, artist, writer and TV personality
 Robert Montano, American film and television actor
 Severino Montano (1915-1980), Filipino playwright, writer, director and actor
 Benito Arias Montano (1527-1598) (not Montaño), Spanish orientalist
 Also a governor and a soldier of the same name and same period 
 :es:Montano (desambiguación) rarer Spanish surnames as Montano, no ñ.

See also
 Montaño, common Spanish surname
 Alysia Montaño née Johnson, American track and field athlete, 800 metres national champion
 Cristian Montaño, Colombian football player
 Miguel Montaño (born 1991), Colombian footballer who plays for Seattle Sounders FC